Mantra Shakti (The Power of Chantis) is a Bengali drama film directed by Chitta Basu and produced by Harendranath Chattopadhyay. This film was released in 1954 under the banner of H. N. C. Productions.

Cast
 Uttam Kumar
 Anubha Gupta
 Asit Baran
 Bhanu Banerjee
 Ahindra Choudhury
 Molina Devi
 Manju Dey
 Jahar Ganguly
 Sandhyarani
 Kanu Banerjee
 Preeti Majumdar
 Ranibala
 Robi Roy

References

External links
 

1954 films
Bengali-language Indian films
Indian drama films
Indian black-and-white films
1950s Bengali-language films
1954 drama films